Herpetogramma mutualis is a moth in the family Crambidae. It was described by Zeller in 1852. It is found in the Democratic Republic of Congo (North Kivu, East Kasai, Equateur, Orientale), Namibia, Somalia, South Africa and Tanzania (Zanzibar).

References

Moths described in 1852
Herpetogramma
Moths of Africa